Micromonospora fulviviridis is an endophytic actinomycete.

References

Further reading

External links

LPSN
Type strain of Micromonospora fulviviridis at BacDive -  the Bacterial Diversity Metadatabase

Micromonosporaceae
Bacteria described in 2005